Shalyar Rural District is a rural district (dehestan) in Uraman District, Sarvabad County, Kurdistan Province, Iran. At the 2006 census, its population was 5,574, in 1,220 families. The rural district has 9 villages.

References 

Rural Districts of Kurdistan Province
Sarvabad County